Lake George may refer to any of these lakes in Indiana, USA:

Lake George (Steuben County, Indiana), a recreational lake on the Indiana-Michigan state line
Lake George (Hammond, Indiana), a lake in the city of Hammond, Lake County
Lake George (Hobart, Indiana), a mill pond in the city of Hobart, Lake County

See also
Lake George (disambiguation)